The Suisun Bay Reserve Fleet colloquially know as the mothball fleet, is located on the northwest side of Suisun Bay (the northern portion of the greater San Francisco Bay estuary) in Benicia, California. It begins just north of the Union Pacific Railroad Bridge and runs northeast, parallel to the shoreline. , eight ships remain in the fleet.

Purpose  

The United States Maritime Administration (MARAD) military caretaker oversees the National Defense Reserve Fleet, which serves as a buffer of ships for national defense and national emergency purposes. The program began in 1946 at the end of World WarII. At its peak in 1950, it had more than 2,000 ships in lay-up. One of the reserve sites is in Suisun Bay, in the northern portion of San Francisco Bay, in California. Only a small portion of vessels currently remain with the Suisun fleet. In January 2016, the U.S. Department of Transportation (DOT) and MARAD have officially announced the Suisun site closure in February 2017, any remaining ships will be sold at auction or scrapped. The only occupied reserve fleets are the James River Reserve Fleet in Virginia and the Beaumont Reserve Fleet in Texas.

Environmental issues 

The State of California and several environmental groups have raised concerns about the environmental impacts of the fleet. Potential concerns include heavy metals and anti-fouling agents in the paint that is peeling off of the vessels, as well as PCBs and other hazardous materials that may have been released. Congress responded to these concerns by funding the National Oceanic and Atmospheric Administration (NOAA) to design and implement a study of contaminants in the vicinity of the fleet.

NOAA's Damage Assessment, Response, and Restoration Program (DARRP) began work on this project in January 2008. Since then, NOAA's team has assessed existing data from the area to determine data gaps, researched the history and environmental setting of the site, discussed the project with numerous stakeholders, conducted a site visit, and developed and refined a sampling and analysis plan. NOAA deployed bivalve samples in June 2008 and collected sediment and bivalve tissue samples from the area in July 2008. A second field sampling event for additional tissue samples occurred in September. These samples were analyzed and a data report was delivered in early 2009.

Based on these findings, the United States Government has reached an agreement with Arc Ecology, San Francisco BayKeeper, Natural Resources Defense Council, and the California Regional Water Quality Control Board, San Francisco Bay Region (Regional Board) regarding the maintenance and disposal of obsolete ships owned by the U.S. Department of Transportation's Maritime Administration (MARAD) at the Suisun Bay Reserve Fleet site, resolving a lawsuit in the Eastern District of California. Under the agreement, MARAD will clean, maintain, and dispose of these ships in a manner that eliminates sources of Bay pollution. The Maritime Administration has already begun removing obsolete ships from Suisun Bay for recycling. Several ships have left since November 2009.  eight ships remain.

Under the terms of the settlement:

 Hazardous paint debris collected on vessel decks will be removed within 120 days
 All the obsolete ships currently located at the site will be cleaned of flaking paint within two years
 Twenty-eight ships in the worst condition will be removed for disposal by 30 September 2012
 Before their removal, these ships will be sent to a local drydock for cleaning (removing marine growth from the underwater hull and removing flaking paint from areas above the water)
 All the obsolete ships currently located at the site will be removed for disposal by September 30, 2017
 Before removal, the ships will be maintained according to locally approved best management practices, as monitored by the Regional Board
 The horizontal surfaces of the obsolete ships will be cleaned every 90 days to prevent peeling paint from getting into the water, monthly and quarterly inspections will be conducted, and water runoff samples will be collected regularly
 No new ships with excess flaking paint will be admitted to the fleet site

Inventory

Current 

:

Notable former 

sold for scrap in 2013

moved to Arkansas Inland Maritime Museum as a museum ship
moved to the port of Los Angeles as a museum ship
Sea Shadow (IX-529)

Glomar Exploreralso known as USNS Hughes Glomar Explorer (T-AG-193)and later as GSF Explorer

See also 

 Naval Inactive Ship Maintenance Facility
 Ready Reserve Force
 Sacramento Deep Water Ship Channel
 Stockton Deepwater Shipping Channel

References

External links 

1996 episode of California's Gold 
National Defense Reserve Fleet Suisun Bay Photo Special
 NavSource Naval History
Property Management and Archive Record System

 
United States Navy Reserve
Fleets of the United States Navy
National Defense Reserve Fleet
Military in the San Francisco Bay Area